Hermann von Heinemann (1 March 1812 in Helmstedt – 18 December 1871 in Braunschweig) was a German entomologist who specialised initially in Coleoptera and later in Lepidoptera.

Heinemann was a customs inspector. He wrote Die Schmetterlinge Deutschlands und der Schweiz (1859–1877) published in Braunschweig. In English the title is "Butterflies of Germany and Switzerland". It was completed by Maximilian Ferdinand Wocke. The second volume on microlepidoptera was especially important.

Heinemann's collection of microlepidoptera is in the Lower Saxony State Museum (Niedersachsisches Landesmuseum) Hannover.

References
 Hevers, J. 2006 Die entomologischen Sammlungen des Staatlichen Naturhistorischen Museums in Braunschweig. Braunschweiger Naturkundliche Schriften. 7 (3) : 697–757. 
 Kraatz, G. 1871 [Heinemann, H. von] Berliner Entomologische Zeitschrift. 15 VIII–IX. 
 Newman, E. 1872 [Heinemann, H. von] Entomologist. 6 32. 
 Wallace, A. R. 1871 [Heinemann, H. von] Transactions of Entomological Society of London. [1871] LIII.

1812 births
1871 deaths
Coleopterists
German lepidopterists
People from Helmstedt
People from the Duchy of Brunswick